Sơn Thủy may refer to several places in Vietnam, including:

, a rural commune of Mai Châu District
, a rural commune of Văn Bàn District
, a rural commune of Thanh Thủy District
Sơn Thủy, Quảng Bình, a rural commune of Lệ Thủy District
, a rural commune of Sơn Hà District
, a rural commune of Quan Sơn District
, a rural commune of A Lưới District